Testudo (which meant "tortoise" in classical Latin) may refer to:

 Battering ram, an armored siege engine with metal plating on the top to protect from missiles fired from above
 Chevrolet Testudo, a concept car designed and built by Bertone on a Chevrolet Corvair unibody chassis
 Steel Testudo or the Nationalist-Socialist Party of Romania, 1930s political party
 Testudo (mascot), the mascot of University of Maryland, College Park
 Testudo (genus), a genus in the tortoise family of turtles
 Testudo formation, a Roman military tactic which involved a formation of soldiers using their shields to form a tortoise-shell-like protective cover against enemy weapons
 Testudo, the Latin variant of the Greek chelys harp, involving a sound-box made from a tortoise shell
 Testudo, an obsolete constellation now in the constellation of Pisces

See also
 Tortoise (disambiguation)